Lewis Hyde (born 15 July 2002) is a Scottish footballer who plays as a midfielder for Inverness Caledonian Thistle.

Career
Born in Inverness, Hyde started his career at Inverness Caledonian Thistle and made his debut for the club on 7 September 2019 in a 3–1 victory over Greenock Morton in the Scottish Challenge Cup.

He joined Fort William on loan in January 2020. 

In December 2020, he joined Highland Football League side Rothes on loan until January 2021.

In summer 2021, Hyde signed a new contract with Inverness. In September 2021, he returned to Rothes on loan, and scored a last minute winner in his first appearance back at the club to beat Blackburn United 2–1 in the Scottish Cup. He was recalled from his loan in February 2022.

In May 2022, Hyde signed a new contract with Inverness, keeping him at the club for the following season.

Career statistics

References

External links
 
 
 Lewis Hyde at ictfc.com
 Lewis Hyde at rothesfc.co.uk

Living people
2002 births
Scottish footballers
Footballers from Inverness
Association football midfielders
Inverness Caledonian Thistle F.C. players
Fort William F.C. players
Rothes F.C. players
Highland Football League players
Scottish Professional Football League players